Richard Rubenstein or Rubinstein may refer to:

Richard E. Rubenstein (born 1938), American author and academic
Richard L. Rubenstein (1924–2021), Jewish American author and academic
Richard Rubinstein (1921–2005), British Army officer
Richard P. Rubinstein (born 1947), TV producer